Abel Xavier Nzuzi Lubota is an Angolan politician for the CASA–CE and a member of the National Assembly of Angola.

References

Year of birth missing (living people)
Living people
Members of the National Assembly (Angola)
21st-century Angolan politicians
Place of birth missing (living people)